Sanyuanqiao may refer to:

Sanyuan Bridge, overpass in Beijing, China
Sanyuanqiao Station, on Beijing Subway, China